Viktor Pilchin (6 April 1940 – 26 May 2004) was a Soviet sailor. He competed at the 1960 Summer Olympics, the 1964 Summer Olympics, and the 1968 Summer Olympics.

References

External links
 

1940 births
2004 deaths
Soviet male sailors (sport)
Olympic sailors of the Soviet Union
Sailors at the 1960 Summer Olympics – Flying Dutchman
Sailors at the 1964 Summer Olympics – Flying Dutchman
Sailors at the 1968 Summer Olympics – Flying Dutchman
Sportspeople from Moscow